The Lake County Courthouse in Madison, South Dakota was built in 1935.  It was listed on the National Register of Historic Places in 1993.

The courthouse is at the center of a square block which also includes a Public Safety Building, which is a jail.

It was designed by architects Hugill & Blatherwick in Art Deco style.

References

Courthouses on the National Register of Historic Places in South Dakota
National Register of Historic Places in Lake County, South Dakota
Moderne architecture in the United States
Art Deco architecture in South Dakota
Government buildings completed in 1935